The Voice of Bugle Ann is a 1936 American drama film directed by Richard Thorpe and starring Lionel Barrymore and Maureen O'Sullivan. It was based on a novel of the same name by MacKinlay Kantor.

Plot synopsis 
The countrymen in the hills of Missouri take the hounds on night fox hunts. This goes on until Jacob Terry comes into the county and decides to raise sheep and install a woven wire fence. This upsets the neighbors, as they are concerned about the dogs entering his fences and terrorizing the sheep. Jacob vows to shoot any dogs or people that he finds on his land. Bengy Davis is in love with Camden Terry and that alone causes problems. But when the hound, Bugle Ann is missing one night, both sides are out with guns to settle the score.

Cast 
 Lionel Barrymore as Spring Davis
 Maureen O'Sullivan as Camden Terry
 Eric Linden as Benjy Davis
 Dudley Digges as Jacob Terry
 Spring Byington as Ma Davis
 Charley Grapewin as Cal Royster
 Henry Wadsworth as Bake Royster
 William Newell as Mr. Tanner
 James Macklin as Del Royster
 Jonathan Hale as District Attorney
 Frederick Burton as The warden

See also
Lionel Barrymore filmography

Production dates 

25 November—30 December 1935

References

External links

1936 films
American drama films
Films based on American novels
Films directed by Richard Thorpe
Metro-Goldwyn-Mayer films
1936 drama films
American black-and-white films
Films based on works by MacKinlay Kantor
1930s American films